Tiedong District is a district of the city of Anshan, Liaoning province, People's Republic of China. It is the seat of Anshan's government and the main business and shopping district of the city.

Leishishan Park, Renmin Park, 219 Park and Dongshan Park, are located here. The Jade Buddha Palace, housing the world's largest statue of Buddha made from jade, is a major tourist attraction and located at the northeast of 219 Park. Anshan museum is located beside the temple.

Tiedong district contains two universities: Anshan Normal University and Liaoning University of Science and Technology.

Elementary Schools
 Huayu Elementary School
 Lieshishan Elementary School
 Shengli Elementary School
 Gangdu Elementary School
 Shannan Elementary School
 Dongchangdian Elementary School
 219 Elementary School
 Zhangda Elementary School 
 Xiangyang Elementary School 
 Changqing Elementary School 
 Gardens Elementary School
 Hunan Elementary School
 Tiedong Teachers' College for Vocational Studies Affiliated Elementary School
 Qinghua Elementary School
 Fengguang Elementary School
 Xinhua Elementary School
 Heping Elementary School
 Nanchangdian Elementary School

Middle Schools
 No.2 Middle School
 No.15 Middle School
 No.26 Middle School
 No.29 Middle School
 No.31 Middle School
 Huayu Foreign Language Experimental School
 Anshan Normal University Middle School

High Schools
 No.1 High School
 No.9 High School
 Angang High School
 Tianjiabing Senior High School
 Tiyuchang Road Vocational Senior High School
 Qianshan Senior High School
 Tianjiabing Senior High School
 Lankai Fine Arts Senior High School
 Xinyuan Senior High School

Administrative divisions
There are 12 subdistricts.

Subdistricts:
 Dongchangdian Subdistrict
 Changdian Subdistrict
 Hunan Subdistrict
 Changqing Subdistrict
 Jiefang Subdistrict
 Shannan Subdistrict
 Yuanlin Subdistrict
 Shengli Subdistrict
 Zhanqian Subdistrict Subdistrict
 Gangcheng Subdistrict
 Heping Subdistrict
 Duilu Subdistrict

References

External links

County-level divisions of Liaoning
Anshan